Karysh-Yelga (Qarışyılğa) is a rural locality (a village) in Novoberdyashsky Selsoviet, Karaidelsky District, Bashkortostan, Russia. The population was 24 as of 2010. There is 1 street.

Geography 
Karysh-Yelga is located 45 km southeast of Karaidel (the district's administrative centre) by road. Dyurtyuli is the nearest rural locality.

References 

Rural localities in Karaidelsky District